Tsapkovo is a rural locality (a selo) in Novokalitvenskoye Rural Settlement, Rossoshansky District, Voronezh Oblast, Russia. The population was 192 as of 2010. There are 11 streets.

Geography 
Tsapkovo is located 58 km southeast of Rossosh (the district's administrative centre) by road. Ivanovka is the nearest rural locality.

References 

Rural localities in Rossoshansky District